Maximilian Volke (Munich, Kingdom of Bavaria, 23 May 1915 – Mirandola, Italy, 5 September 1944) was a Luftwaffe Oberfeldwebel (flight sergeant) and 37-victory fighter ace of the Jagdgeschwader 77.

A veteran of the campaigns in Russia and Africa, he was shot down in his Messerschmitt Bf 109 fighter over Emilia-Romagna in northern Italy, during the Gothic Line operations, on 9 September 1944, by a gunner in an American B-25 Mitchell bomber. Volke was 29 years and was decorated with the German Cross in Gold, received as Feldwebel in the II./JG 77 on 12 July 1943.

Ofw. Volke's remains and parts of his aircraft were located and dug out of a farmer's field in Mirandola, just north of Modena by an Italian amateur war history research team (the Romagna Air Finders) in July 2007, nearly 63 years after he was shot down.

References
Citations

Bibliography

 Michulec, Robert (2002). Luftwaffe at War/Luftwaffe Aces of the Western Front. London: Greenhill Books. .
 Patzwall, Klaus D. and Scherzer, Veit. Das Deutsche Kreuz 1941 – 1945 Geschichte und Inhaber Band II. Norderstedt, Germany: Verlag Klaus D. Patzwall, 2001. .

External links

Remains of German World War II Ace Found – Associated Press, 15 August 2007
German World War II aces with 33 to 39 victories – At the Kaczmarek website, by Fuß
JG 77 air victories 1942, 1943, 1944/45 – At the Ciel de Gloire website

1915 births
1944 deaths
Luftwaffe pilots
Luftwaffe personnel killed in World War II
German World War II flying aces
Recipients of the Gold German Cross
Military personnel from Munich
People from the Kingdom of Bavaria